Isthmura boneti, commonly known as the Oaxacan false brook salamander, is a species of salamander in the family Plethodontidae. It is endemic to north-central Oaxaca, Mexico. Its natural habitats are pine and pine-oak forests at high elevations. It is terrestrial and found beneath logs and rocks. Formerly very abundant, the species has declined for unknown reasons; it has also declined in suitable habitat, so habitat loss is not a sufficient explanation.

References

boneti
Amphibians described in 1967
Endemic amphibians of Mexico
Fauna of the Sierra Madre de Oaxaca
Taxonomy articles created by Polbot